ALETAR is a submarine telecommunications cable system in the Mediterranean Sea linking Egypt and Syria.

It has landing points in:
 Alexandria, Egypt.
 Tartous, Syria.

It started operation on 7 April 1997.

References

Submarine communications cables in the Mediterranean Sea
Egypt–Syria relations
1997 establishments in Egypt
1997 establishments in Syria